Adam Christopher Jackson (1929-1989), was an Irish born champion trainer of Great Britain.

Career
Jackson moved to England from Ireland and gained a position as a kennelhand for Paddy McEvoy in 1953 (who was employed by the Greyhound Racing Association at the time). He secured his own trainer's licence in 1959 and was attached to Slough Stadium, replacing Jack Kinsley who had moved to Wembley.

He was transferred to Clapton Stadium in 1963 and trained out of the Claverhambury Kennels (no 6) in Waltham Abbey. The move catapulted his career and he gained great success.

In 1965 he won the 1965 English Greyhound Derby with Chittering Clapton. Pallas Joy won the 1969 Welsh Greyhound Derby before Jackson was given a greyhound called Patricias Hope to train. The white and fawn dog became an all time great and provided Jackson with a second English Derby triumph and a Triple Crown in 1972.

He won a second Scottish Greyhound Derby with Dashalong Chief in 1973 before moving to White City following the sale of Clapton to the Greyhound Racing Association. During 1982 he won the Trainer's Championship and switched from White City to Wembley.

Awards
Despite being Irish born he was voted the United Kingdom Greyhound Trainer of the Year in 1982.

Personal life 
He was born in Ireland on 31 May 1929 in Ballymore Eustace, the youngest of five children. He contracted Polio at the age of 18 and after taking two years to recover was left with a limp throughout his life. He worked a series of odd jobs before emigrating to England in 1953. He died from cancer during 1989.

References 

British greyhound racing trainers
Irish greyhound racing trainers
1929 births
1989 deaths